Stigmella lucida is a species of moth in the family Nepticulidae. It is endemic to New Zealand.

The length of the forewings is about 3 mm. Adults have been recorded in January and from September to December. There are one or two generations per year.

The larvae feed on Nothofagus menziesii. They mine the leaves of their host plant. The mine starts close to the midrib near the stem as a narrow gallery. At first, only the lower part of the leaf tissue is eaten, but gradually, as the mine becomes wider, it reaches both cuticular layers. The frass is deposited in the middle of the mine, later filling all space. Larva have been recorded from May to August and in October and November. They are about 3 mm long and pale green.

The cocoon is made of white to pale brown silk and is constructed amidst foliage and branches of the food plant.

References

External links
Fauna of New Zealand - Number 16: Nepticulidae (Insecta: Lepidoptera)

Nepticulidae
Moths of New Zealand
Endemic fauna of New Zealand
Moths described in 1919
Endemic moths of New Zealand
Taxa named by Alfred Philpott